Professor Moffett's Science Workshop is a Canadian children's science television series which aired on CBC Television from 1972 to 1974.

Premise
Scientific topics such as aeronautics, astronomy, biology, geology, optics and thermodynamics were geared towards an audience between ages nine and fourteen. British designer, engineer and  professor Maxwell G. Moffett demonstrated these principles with basic items such as bells, bottles and cans. Moffett hosted this series with assistance from young siblings Claire Anne Bundy and Stuart Bundy.

Scheduling
This half-hour series was broadcast Mondays at 5:00 p.m. (Eastern) in two seasons from 11 September 1972 to 19 March 1973 and from 10 September 1973 to 4 March 1974.

References

External links
 

CBC Television original programming
1972 Canadian television series debuts
1974 Canadian television series endings